I'm Hot may refer to:

I'm Hot, album by Germany-based disco diva Cherry Laine CBS 1979
"I'm Hot", song by Erick Sermon from Music (Erick Sermon album)
"I'm Hot", song by Jermaine Dupri from Young, Fly & Flashy, Vol. 1